Daniel Lawrence Whitney (born February 17, 1963), known professionally by his persona Larry the Cable Guy, is an American stand-up comedian, actor, producer, and former radio personality.

He was one of the members of the Blue Collar Comedy Tour, a comedy troupe which included Bill Engvall, Ron White, and Jeff Foxworthy (with whom he has starred on Blue Collar TV).

Larry the Cable Guy has released seven comedy albums, of which three have been certified gold by the RIAA for shipments of 500,000 copies. He has starred in three Blue Collar Comedy Tour–related films, as well as in Larry the Cable Guy: Health Inspector, Delta Farce, and Witless Protection, as well as voicing Mater in the Cars franchise. Whitney's catchphrase "Git-R-Done!" is also the title of his book.

Early life
Dan Whitney was born in Nebraska to Tom and Shirley Whitney, and grew up on an 80-acre farm outside Pawnee City, Nebraska. His father was a Christian minister. When he was 16, his family moved to West Palm Beach, Florida.  Whitney attended high school at The King's Academy in West Palm Beach, Florida, in the late 1970s through 1980 where his father was the elementary school principal. He graduated from Berean Christian School in West Palm Beach in 1982 where he played football. He went to college at Baptist University of America in Georgia, and the University of Nebraska–Lincoln. He majored in drama and speech. He credits his roommates from Texas and Georgia for inspiring his Southern accent impression. He dropped out after his junior year after trying his hand at comedy.

Career

Radio career
Whitney started his career in radio in the early 1990s when he made regular radio appearances on the nationally syndicated program, The Ron and Ron Show, as well as other radio shows such as The Bob & Tom Show, Wakin' Up With The Wolf on WPDH, The Chris Baker Show on KDGE and KEZO's The Todd and Tyler Show in Omaha, Nebraska, as well as the Kirk, Mark, and Lopez morning show on WIYY in Baltimore, Maryland. He was also a frequent guest on The Johnny Dare Morning Show on 98.9/KQRC, Kansas City.

He also appeared on WJRR in Orlando, Florida. He was brought to New England on Greg and the Morning Buzz on WHEB 100.3 and WGIR-FM 101.1 in Portsmouth and Manchester, New Hampshire, respectively, doing two commentaries a week.

Stand-up career

Initially performing stand-up under his real name with limited success, he became famous after developing the Cable Guy character, a personality that he now maintains throughout his stage act. The Cable Guy character has a stereotypical redneck appearance and a thick Southern accent, recounts stories about his "family", and uses, among other common expressions, his own catchphrase "Git-R-Done!".

He says in interviews and in his autobiographical book GIT-R-DONE that he deliberately "turns on" the accent both on and off stage, because he may forget it if he kept his normal accent intact. He uses catchphrase humor, including "Lord, I apologize for that, there, and be with the starvin' Pygmies in New Guinea. Amen" after telling jokes of questionable taste; and, "I don't care who ya are, that's funny right there" after jokes that evoke raucous laughter.

His first two comedy albums, Lord, I Apologize (2001) and The Right to Bare Arms (2005), have both been certified gold by the RIAA. A third album, Morning Constitutions, and its accompanying TV special were released in 2007.

Other work
Whitney was roasted in a Comedy Central special on March 15, 2009.

On February 8, 2011, the premiere of his newest travelogue series, Only in America with Larry the Cable Guy, was broadcast on the History Channel. A total of 4.1 million viewers, 1.7 million adults 25–54, tuned in, nearly doubling the total for the "Top Shot" season 2 opener. During season two in the episode "Larry Goes To Washington", Whitney was the first on-air talent from a non-news crew allowed in the War Room, also known as the Command Center, as he explained during the program. The series finale aired August 28, 2013.

In June 2012, Disneyland's California Adventure theme park's "Cars Land" features a ride called "Mater's Junkyard Jamboree" that features Whitney's voice as his character Mater from the Disney/Pixar Cars movies.

Bektrom Foods of North Dakota developed a line of Larry the Cable Guy food products, such as boxed hamburger dinners, with some of the proceeds from its sales benefiting the "Git-R-Done Foundation".

Whitney competed in season six of The Masked Singer as the wild card contestant "Baby" which was the show's first human character.

Personal life
Whitney and his wife Cara married in 2005. They have a son, Wyatt and a daughter, Reagan. The Whitney family resides in Lincoln, Nebraska, on a 180-acre (73 ha) farm. The couple started the Git-R-Done Foundation in 2009 to provide assistance to those that have experienced hardships beyond their control. Whitney is a Christian who re-committed to his faith in 2014.

Whitney's hometown of Pawnee City, Nebraska, has a street named after him. Whitney also donated money to buy new theatrical equipment for the local high school.

Whitney is an avid Nebraska Cornhuskers football fan. His signature camouflage hat has the University of Nebraska–Lincoln nickname "HUSKERS" emblazoned on it, as seen in the 2007 film Delta Farce. He is also frequently seen with a gold Nebraska "N" on a chain around his neck. On October 1, 2016, in his luxury suite at Memorial Stadium during the Nebraska vs. Illinois football game, Whitney was challenged to an arm wrestling match by an Army veteran and Nebraska Army National Guard member, John O'Connell, who lost the match in less than one minute with his arm (humerus) broken by Whitney.

Whitney is also an avid REO Speedwagon fan. In 2013, he appeared with the group, including a benefit concert in Bloomington, Illinois, for tornado disaster relief.

In September 2010, Whitney donated $5 million to the Arnold Palmer Hospital for Children in Orlando, Florida. The gift was for further development of the International Hip Dysplasia Institute at the Orlando hospital. After Dr. Chad Price at Arnold Palmer Hospital for Children helped cure their son, Wyatt, of his dysplasia when he was an infant, Whitney and his wife, Cara, made private donations to the hospital and Whitney raised money through appearances on Family Feud and Are You Smarter Than a 5th Grader?.

The hospital opened a new wing called the Wyatt Whitney Wing in May 2012.

Whitney is also the proud owner of a George Strait neon sign that he bought backstage at Billy Bob's Texas in Fort Worth, Texas.

Whitney endorsed Gary Johnson for the 2016 U.S. presidential election.

Radio shows
Whitney formerly worked as a radio personality on Blue Collar Radio on Sirius XM Radio.

Discography

 A Box set consisting of The Right to Bare Arms, Christmastime in Larryland, and Morning Constitutions.

Filmography

Film

Television

Video games

Theme park attractions

Awards and nominations

References

External links

1963 births
20th-century American comedians
21st-century American comedians
Actors from Lincoln, Nebraska
American male film actors
American male video game actors
American male voice actors
American stand-up comedians
Entertainers from Nebraska
Living people
Male actors from Nebraska
People from Pawnee City, Nebraska
University of Nebraska–Lincoln alumni
Warner Records artists
Christians from Nebraska